Deadeye Dick is a novel by Kurt Vonnegut originally published in 1982.

Plot summary
The novel's main character, Rudy Waltz, or "Deadeye Dick", commits accidental manslaughter as a child when he shoots a gun out of a window and fatally strikes a pregnant woman. Rudy was so traumatized and guilt-ridden by the incident that he lives life as an asexual "neuter," neither homosexual nor heterosexual. He tells the story of his life as a middle-aged expatriate hotel manager in Haiti, which symbolizes New York City, until the end, when the stream of time of the story catches up with him. At this point, he confronts an event that has been suggested and referred to throughout the novel. The generic Midwestern town of Midland City, Ohio, in which Rudy was raised, is virtually destroyed by a neutron bomb, all the people in the town dying. At the ending of the book, it appears that Rudy, while he may not have fully come to terms with his actions, has at least come to live with them.

Another key theme throughout the book is the relationship between Waltz and his parents and brother, Felix. His father, as a young man, lived in Austria and was one of the few people who was actually friends with Adolf Hitler before his rise to power. His father is also a failed artist, who does his best to protect Rudy, to the point when he insists on going to jail just to effectively make a point. Rudy's brother was the president of NBC, who is fired after his fourth marriage breaks up.

Place in the Vonnegut universe
Deadeye Dick is set mostly within fictional Midland City, Ohio, which is also the setting for one of Vonnegut's other seminal works, Breakfast of Champions. Several characters, locations, or concepts from that novel are mentioned in passing or have an active role in the story (e.g. Rabo Karabekian, Dwayne and Celia Hoover, the Mildred Barry Memorial Center for the Arts, and Barrytron Ltd., amongst others).

Reception
Dave Langford reviewed Deadeye Dick for White Dwarf #56, and stated that "The Vonnegut idiom of brief, flip, casual paragraphs lets him sneak through some shrewd blows under the lighthearted camouflage, but though often moving the technique sometimes rings hollow [...] Read the book, but warily."

References

External links
Vonnegut discusses Deadeye Dick with Martin Amis - a British Library sound recording

1982 American novels
English-language novels
Novels by Kurt Vonnegut
Novels set in Haiti
Novels set in Ohio
Postmodern novels